The Italian Federation of Information and Entertainment Workers (FILIS) was a trade union representing workers in the printing and entertainment industries in Italy.

The union was founded in 1981, when the Italian Federation of Entertainment Workers merged with the Italian Federation of Paper and Printing Workers.  Like its predecessors, it affiliated to the Italian General Confederation of Labour.  By 1995, the union had 53,327 members.

In 1996, the union merged with the Italian Federation of Postal and Telecommunication Workers, to form the Communication Workers' Union.

General Secretaries
1981: Giorgio Colzi
1983: Guglielmo Epifani
1989: Massimo Bordini

References

Entertainment industry unions
Printing trade unions
Trade unions established in 1981
Trade unions disestablished in 1996
Trade unions in Italy